Racing Club de Narbonne Méditerannée (also known as RCNM) is a French rugby union club that play in the second-level Pro D2.

They are based in Narbonne in Occitania. They were founded in 1907. They play at Parc des Sports Et de l'Amitié (capacity 12,000). They wear orange and black.

History
RC Narbonne were established in 1907. The club's first appearance in the domestic championship final came in May 1932, where they faced Lyon in Bordeaux. However, Narbonne were not able to capture their first title, as Lyon would go on to win the final 9 points to three. The following season Narbonne again made it to the final of the league, and once again, Lyon were their opponents. Again played in Bordeaux, Lyon were victorious once again, defeating Narbonne 10 points to three. However, by 1936 Narbonne were once again finalists of the French championship, and on May 10 in Toulouse they defeated Montferrand 6 points to three, claiming their first ever championship.

In 1967 Narbonne contested the final of the Challenge Yves du Manoir, playing FC Lourdes (the 1966 Challenge Yves du Manoir champions). FC Lourdes held onto their title, defeating Narbonne 9 points to three. However the following season, Narbonne were again finalists, and won their first Challenge Yves du Manoir title, defeating Dax 14 points to six.

The 1970s were another successful era for RC Narbonne. In 1973 Narbonne captured their first Challenge Yves du Manoir title since the 1968 season, defeating Béziers 13 points to six. 1974 was a great season for Narbonne; they successfully defended their Challenge Yves du Manoir title by defeating CA Brive in the final, they were also runners-up in the main French championship, being defeated by their 1973 Challenge Yves du Manoir opponents AS Béziers (16 points to 14). In 1978 Narbonne again won the Challenge Yves du Manoir, being awarded the title after drawing 19-all with AS Béziers due to them scoring more tries. 1979 was a very successful year for Narbonne; they were able to hold on to their Challenge Yves du Manoir title, defeating AS Montferrand 9 points to seven, as well as the Challenge Yves du Manoir, Narbonne won the French championship (for the first time since 1936), defeating Stade Bagnérais 10 to nil at Parc des Princes in the final.

Narbonne would also win a number of honours during the 1980s. The club were runners-up in the Challenge Yves du Manoir in 1982, losing to US Dax 19 points to 22 in the final. Narbonne won it again in 1984, defeating Toulouse 17 points to 13 in the final. In 1985 Narbonne won the Coupe de France, defeating AS Béziers 28 to 27 after extra time. In 1989 Narbonne won the Challenge Yves du Manoir again, defeating Biarritz 18 points to 12. The club won it again in 1990, defeating Grenoble 24 to 19 in the final. Narbonne made it three in a row after winning the 1991 Challenge Yves du Manoir, defeating CA Bègles 24 to 19 in the final game. Narbonne came close to winning the Challenge Yves du Manoir four times in a row, but lost to SU Agen 23-18 in the final. In 2001 Narbonne were runners-up in the European Challenge Cup, losing to the Harlequins 42 to 33 in the final.

The Club has been owned by an Australian Consortium since 2012. The consortium includes Bob Dwyer, Rocky Elsom, Pete O'Connell and Chris Bayman. RCNM made the finals of ProD2 in 2013/14 season losing narrowly to SG Agen. This was achieved with the smallest player budget in the League and the innovation in recruitment, preparation and training enabled the club to perform well above expectation.

Honours
 French championship:
 Champions: 1936, 1979
 Runners-up: 1932, 1933, 1974
 European Challenge Cup:
 Runners-up: 2001
 Challenge Yves du Manoir:
 Champions: 1968, 1973, 1974, 1978, 1979, 1984, 1989, 1990, 1991
 Runners-up: 1967, 1982, 1992
 Coupe de France:
 Champions: 1985

Finals results

French championship

Challenge Yves du Manoir

Coupe de France

European Challenge Cup

Current standings

Current squad

The Narbonne squad for 2022–23 season is:

Espoirs squad

Notable former players

  Ignacio Corleto
  Mario Ledesma
  Gonzalo Longo
  Gonzalo Quesada
  Martín Scelzo
  Huia Edmonds
  Rocky Elsom
  Justin Harrison
  Julian Huxley
  Brett Sheehan
  Jone Tawake
  Josh Valentine
  Stan Wright
  René Araou
  Jean-Michel Benacloï
  Laurent Bénézech
  Gérard Bertrand
  Étienne Bonnes
  Julien Candelon
  Aimé Cassayet-Armagnac
  Didier Codorniou
  Patrick Estève
  Jean-Pierre Hortoland
  Christian Labit
  Jean-Marc Lescure
  Arnaud Martinez
  Jo Maso
  Olivier Merle
  Lucien Mias
  Lucien Pariès
  Jean-Baptiste Poux
  Vincent Rattez
  Marc Raynaud
  Francois Sangalli
  Henri Sanz
  Laurent Seigne
  Claude Spanghero
  Jean-Marie Spanghero
  Walter Spanghero
  Gérard Sutra
  Franck Tournaire
  Raynor Parkinson
  Federico Pucciariello
  Alessandro Stoica
  Massimo Giovanelli
  Marco Bortolami
  Tiberiu Brînză
  Gabriel Vlad
  Jerry Collins
  David Smith
  Karl Tu'inukuafe
  Willem de Waal
  Louis Koen
  Bryan Redpath
  Stuart Reid
  Luke Hume
  Gareth Llewellyn

See also
 List of rugby union clubs in France
 Rugby union in France

References

External links
  Racing Club de Narbonne Méditerannée Official website

Narbonne
Rugby clubs established in 1907
Sport in Aude
Narbonne